The Judiciary and Courts (Scotland) Act 2008 is an Act of the Scottish Parliament passed in October 2008 to reform the courts of Scotland, to give statutory force to judicial independence, and to establish the Lord President of the Court of Session as Head of the Judiciary of Scotland.

History

Provisions

Judicial independence 
Judicial independence is enshrined by Section 1 of the Act, which stipulates specific duties to uphold judicial independence on:

 The First Minister of Scotland
 The Lord Advocate
 The Scottish Ministers
 Members of the Scottish Parliament
 and others "with responsibility for matters relating to the judiciary or the administration of justice" in Scotland;

All of those specified are barred from using any form of special access to influence the judgements or decisions made by the judiciary of Scotland.

References 

Courts of Scotland
Acts of the Scottish Parliament 2008
Judiciary of Scotland